Darcie Edgemon (born October 31, 1980 in San Leandro) is a children's book author from Pacific Grove, California. He currently resides in Monterey, California.  

She authored the children's book Seamore, the Very Forgetful Porpoise, published by HarperCollins, which was called "Effervescent" by Booklist "...bright, cheery, and child-friendly" by the School Library Journal, and "dear and deadpan" by Kirkus Reviews. She has also contributed to the published books The Fuchsia is Now and Quincy, the Hobby Photographer, both written by J. Otto Seibold.

References

American children's writers
People from Pacific Grove, California
People from Monterey, California
People from San Leandro, California